Mississippi Highway 316 (MS 316) is a state highway connecting Friars Point, Jonestown, and Marks in the Mississippi Delta region of Mississippi.

Route description
MS 316 begins at the eastern city limits of Friars Point along Rozell Lane. Unsigned at this point, it heads east along Friars Point Road as a county-maintained two-lane road towards a stop-intersection with MS 1. The road continues east through agricultural fields until it skits the southern limits of Coahoma and has a grade crossing with the Mississippi Delta Railroad. MS 316 curves to the southeast where it first intersects US 49/US 61, then continues further southeast towards Jonestown. In the town, MS 316 travels along Coahoma Road and Main Street. Past the town's eastern limit, state maintenance begins and the MS 316 is signed. The road parallels Moore Bayou towards the southeast before heading east into Quitman County. It briefly parallels Moore Bayou again before heading through Belen. The highway resumes a southeasterly course before ending at US 278 / MS 6 west of Marks.

Major intersections

References

External links

Highways of the State of Mississippi - Mississippi State Route 316

316
Transportation in Coahoma County, Mississippi
Transportation in Quitman County, Mississippi